Japan participated at the 2018 Summer Youth Olympics in Buenos Aires, Argentina from 6 October to 18 October 2018.

Japan competes in 23 events and brought home 39 medals.

It was the rehearsal of the hosting Summer Olympics as Tokyo was the host of the 2020 games which was held from 23 July to 8 August 2021.

Medalists

|  style="text-align:left; width:78%; vertical-align:top;"|

|  style="text-align:left; width:22%; vertical-align:top;"|

Competitors

Archery

Japan qualified two archers based on its performance at the 2017 World Archery Youth Championships.

Individual

Team

Athletics

Boys
Track & road events

Field Events

Girls
Track & road events

Field Events

 Cross Country

Badminton

Japan qualified two players based on the Badminton Junior World Rankings. 

Singles

Team

Cycling

Japan qualified a boys' and girls' combined team based on its ranking in the Youth Olympic Games Junior Nation Rankings. They also qualified a mixed BMX racing team based on its ranking in the Youth Olympic Games BMX Junior Nation Rankings and two athletes in BMX freestyle based on its performance at the 2018 Urban Cycling World Championship.

 Boys' combined team – 1 team of 2 athletes
 Girls' combined team – 1 team of 2 athletes
 Mixed BMX racing team – 1 team of 2 athletes
 Mixed BMX freestyle – 1 boy and 1 girl

Dancesport

Japan qualified two dancers based on its performance at the 2018 World Youth Breaking Championship.

 B-Boys – Shigekix
 B-Girls – Ram

Fencing

Japan qualified three athletes based on its performance at the 2018 Cadet World Championship.

Futsal

Girls
Summary

Group D

Semi-finals

Finals

Golf

Individual

Team

Gymnastics

Artistic
Japan qualified two gymnasts based on its performance at the 2018 Asian Junior Championship.

Rhythmic
Japan qualified one gymnast based on its performance at the 2018 Asian Junior Championship.

Individual

Trampoline
Japan qualified two gymnasts based on its performance at the 2018 Asian Junior Championship.

 Boys' trampoline – 1 quota
 Girls' trampoline – 1 quota

Karate

Japan qualified three athlete based on the rankings in the Buenos Aires 2018 Olympic Standings. Later, they qualified three more athletes based on its performance at one of the Karate Qualification Tournaments.

Modern pentathlon

Rowing

Japan qualified one boat based on its performance at the 2018 Asian Youth Olympic Games Qualification Regatta.

 Boys' single sculls – 1 athlete

Rugby sevens

Boys' tournament

Summary

Group Stage

Bronze medal match

Sailing

Japan qualified one boat based on its performance at the 2018 Singapore Open (Asian Techno 293+ Qualifiers).

 Boys' Techno 293+ – 1 boat

Shooting

 Girls Rifle – Aoi Takagi

Individual

Team

Sport climbing

Japan qualified two sport climbers based on its performance at the 2017 World Youth Sport Climbing Championships. They also qualified a female climber based on its performance at the 2017 Asian Youth Sport Climbing Championships.

 Boys' combined – 2 quotas (Keita Dohi, Shuta Tanaka)
 Girls' combined – 1 quota (Mao Nakamura)

Swimming

Boys

Girls

Mixed

 Swimmers who participated in the heats only.
 Swimmers who participated in the heats only and received medals.

Table tennis

Japan qualified two table tennis players based on its performance at the Asian Continental Qualifier.

 Boys' singles – Tomokazu Harimoto
 Girls' singles – Miu Hirano

Taekwondo

Tennis

Triathlon

Japan qualified two athletes based on its performance at the 2018 Asian Youth Olympic Games Qualifier.

Individual

Relay

Weightlifting

Japan qualified one athlete based on its performance at the 2018 Asian Youth Championships.

Wrestling

Boys

Girls

References

2018 in Japanese sport
Nations at the 2018 Summer Youth Olympics
Japan at the Youth Olympics